Iliciovca is a commune in Florești District, Moldova. It is composed of two villages, Iliciovca and Maiscoe.

References

Communes of Florești District